Lost Lake is a lake in Mount Hood National Forest  northwest of Mount Hood in Hood River County in the U.S. state of Oregon.

The lake is bounded on the east by  Lost Lake Butte and on the southwest by  Preachers Peak. The lake is fed by three unnamed intermittent creeks from Lost Lake Butte, and Inlet Creek from Preachers Peak. The lake maintains a very consistent level via an outlet at the north tip, the source of Lake Branch Hood River, a tributary of West Fork Hood River.

Recreation 
The lake is a popular recreational site, with 125 primitive campsites,
seven rustic cabins, and a rustic general store.  The resort's normal season is May through October.  Canoes, row boats, and kayaks are available for rental; motor craft are not allowed.
A day use fee applies to all vehicles entering the area, payable to the concessionaire.

Astrophotography has become a popular activity at Lost Lake with the rise of social media attracting photographers to capture the Milky Way and Mount Hood.

Wildlife 
The lake contains brook trout, brown trout, kokanee salmon, rainbow trout, crayfish, otter, and beaver.  Throughout the area are blacktail deer, Roosevelt elk, squirrels, chipmunks, rabbits, black bear, cougar, and bobcat.  The heavily forested area consists mostly of Douglas-fir and mountain hemlock with some cedar and white pine.  Alder and huckleberry underbrush occurs in open areas.

Protection 
The area is a part of the proposed Lewis and Clark Mount Hood Wilderness which would prevent development, logging, mining, and likely would require the removal of structures and roads.

History 
Native Americans called the lake E-e-kwahl-a-mat-yam-lshkt (heart of the mountains).
The name Lost Lake came from Mack Hollamon, who was a hunting and fishing guide during the turn of the 19th century.  He had guided for many years throughout Mount Hood but did not come across the lake until Native Americans later showed him where it was.  So he called it Lost Lake on his future trips.  He also named Dinger Lake and Frying Pan Lake.

Gallery

See also 
 List of lakes in Oregon

References

External links
 

Lakes of Oregon
Mount Hood National Forest
Protected areas of Hood River County, Oregon
Rivers of Hood River County, Oregon